"Get Down" is a song by Dutch disc jockeys and producers Tiësto and Tony Junior. It was released as digital download on 29 December 2015 by Musical Freedom in the Netherlands.

Reviews 
Austin Evenson from the webmedia Dancing Astronaut declares that, "Implementing a barrage of blaring horns and thunderous kicks, the duo pack on whiplashing wubs to create a contrasting soundscape that ultimately fits together." According to Fabian Dori from French webmedia Guettapen, "Get Down" is "a track which doesn't matter in Musical Freedom discography but which reminds a bit to much 'Rock the Party' of Jauz & Ephwurd for the awarest ears."

Music video 
The music video was premiered on Spinnin' Records' official YouTube channel on 29 December 2015. It shows a little boy hearing music in her headphones and walking in a city.

Track listing 
 Digital Download (MF149)
 "Get Down" - 3:31

 Digital download (MF149)
 "Get Down" (Extended Mix) - 4:01

Charts

References 

2015 songs
2015 singles
Tiësto songs
Songs written by Tiësto